Chaz Daniel Roe (born October 9, 1986) is an American professional baseball pitcher who is currently a free agent. He has played in Major League Baseball (MLB) for the Arizona Diamondbacks, New York Yankees, Baltimore Orioles, Atlanta Braves, and Tampa Bay Rays.

Career
Roe attended Lafayette High School in Lexington, Kentucky. In 2004 as a high school player, Roe was considered by Baseball America to be the number 35 prospect in the United States.

Colorado Rockies
Roe was selected by the Colorado Rockies in the first round (32nd overall) of the 2005 Major League Baseball Draft.
On September 3, 2010, Roe was called up to the majors for the first time but he did not appear in any games.

Seattle Mariners
On December 2, 2010, Roe was traded to the Seattle Mariners for José López. He was designated for assignment by Seattle on June 29, 2011, after recording a 6.41 ERA with Triple-A Tacoma.

Laredo Lemurs
Roe signed with the Laredo Lemurs of the American Association of Independent Professional Baseball for the 2012 season. He pitched in 49 games for the Lemurs, pitching to a 1.47 ERA with 69 strikeouts in 55.0 innings.

Arizona Diamondbacks
Roe signed a minor league contract for the 2013 season with the Arizona Diamondbacks. He made his MLB debut with the Diamondbacks on July 1. He was called up on August 24, 2013, to replace J.J. Putz Roe pitched to a 4.03 ERA in 22.1 innings with the Diamondbacks.

Texas Rangers
On November 1, 2013, Roe was claimed off waivers by the Texas Rangers He was designated for assignment on January 29, 2014. Roe elected free agency on February 5, 2014.

Miami Marlins
On February 6, 2014, Roe signed a minor league contract with the Miami Marlins organization that included an invitation to Spring Training.

New York Yankees
The Marlins traded Roe to the New York Yankees for cash considerations on August 31. He was designated for assignment by the Yankees on September 21, 2014.

Pittsburgh Pirates
On September 23, 2014, Roe was claimed off waivers by the Pittsburgh Pirates.

Baltimore Orioles

On December 12, 2014, Roe was signed to a minor league contract by the Baltimore Orioles. In 36 appearances for the Orioles in 2015, Roe pitched to a 4.14 ERA with 38 strikeouts in 41.1 innings of work. On July 29, 2016, Roe was designated for assignment following the signing of Logan Ondrusek. At the time of his designation, Roe had allowed 4 runs in  innings, striking out 11 and walking 7.

Atlanta Braves
On August 7, 2016, Roe was claimed off waivers by the Atlanta Braves. In 21 games, he posted an ERA of 3.60 in 20 innings, striking out 26. On July 13, 2017, Roe was outrighted off of the 40-man roster and assigned to the Triple-A Gwinnett Braves.

Tampa Bay Rays
On July 18, 2017, Roe was traded to the Tampa Bay Rays for cash considerations and assigned to the Triple-A Durham Bulls. He was called up in September when rosters expanded. In 8 games, he posted an ERA of 1.07 in  innings. He struck out 12. The following season, he opened the season in the Rays bullpen. On July 8, he was placed on the disabled list. Roe finished with career highs all over the board, posting an ERA of 3.58 in 61 appearances. In 2019, Roe continued to be a mainstay in the Rays bullpen, appearing in a career high 71 games and recording 65 strikeouts in 51 innings. In 2020, Roe pitched to a 2.89 ERA with 9 strikeouts in 9.1 innings pitched. On October 30, 2020, Roe was outrighted off of the 40-man roster and elected free agency. 

On February 21, 2021, Roe re-signed with the Rays on a one-year, $1.15MM contract. After pitching on April 2 against the Miami Marlins, Roe reported discomfort. He was placed on the 10-day injured list with a left shoulder strain with the expectation that he would miss at least twelve weeks of the season. He was later placed on the 60-day injured list on April 6. On June 30, 2021, Roe underwent seasonending surgery on his shoulder.

Awards and honors
 2008 Texas League Pitcher of the Week
 2007 California League Pitcher of the Week
 2005 Pioneer League Post-Season All-Star

References

External links

1986 births
Living people
Sportspeople from Steubenville, Ohio
Baseball players from Ohio
Major League Baseball pitchers
Arizona Diamondbacks players
New York Yankees players
Baltimore Orioles players
Atlanta Braves players
Tampa Bay Rays players
Casper Rockies players
Asheville Tourists players
Modesto Nuts players
Tulsa Drillers players
Phoenix Desert Dogs players
Scottsdale Scorpions players
Colorado Springs Sky Sox players
Tacoma Rainiers players
Laredo Lemurs players
Mobile BayBears players
Reno Aces players
New Orleans Zephyrs players
Norfolk Tides players
Gulf Coast Braves players
Florida Fire Frogs players
Gwinnett Braves players
Durham Bulls players